Skilgate is a village and civil parish  east of Dulverton and  west of Wiveliscombe in the Somerset West and Taunton district of Somerset, England. It has a population of 96.

The parish, which covers an area of 866 ha, straddles the boundary of the Exmoor National Park lying on the southern edge of the Brendon Hills, and is close to the border with Devon.

History

In the Domesday Book the village was recorded as Scheligate, possibly meaning 'the opening on the boundary'. At that time it was held by Robert de Gatemore under Roger Arundel along with another manor in the parish known as Milton. They passed in the 20th century to the Ferguson Davie baronets.

The parish of Skillgate was part of the Williton and Freemanners Hundred.

Governance

The Parish Meeting has responsibility for local issues, there being no Parish Council.

The village falls within the non-metropolitan district of Somerset West and Taunton, which was established on 1 April 2019. It was previously in the district of West Somerset, which was formed on 1 April 1974 under the Local Government Act 1972, and part of Dulverton Rural District before that. The district council is responsible for local planning and building control, local roads, council housing, environmental health, markets and fairs, refuse collection and recycling, cemeteries and crematoria, leisure services, parks, and tourism.

Somerset County Council is responsible for running the largest and most expensive local services such as education, social services, libraries, main roads, public transport, policing and  fire services, trading standards, waste disposal and strategic planning.

It is also part of the Bridgwater and West Somerset county constituency represented in the House of Commons of the Parliament of the United Kingdom. Prior to Brexit in 2020, it was part of the South West England constituency of the European Parliament.

Religious sites

The Church of St John has a 14th-century tower, but the rest of the church was rebuilt in 1872. It has been designated by English Heritage as a Grade II* listed building.

References

Civil parishes in Somerset
Villages in West Somerset